Tontokrom is a small town located in the Amansie South District in the Ashanti Region of Ghana. It is mostly known for its gold and has recently been noted for the menace  of illegal mining popularly called galamsey.

References 

Populated places in the Ashanti Region